The Citadel Bulldogs volleyball team represents The Citadel in the sport of indoor volleyball.  The Bulldogs compete in Division I of the National Collegiate Athletics Association (NCAA) and the Southern Conference (SoCon), and play their home matches in McAlister Field House on the school's Charleston, South Carolina campus. They are currently led by head coach Dave Zelenock, who in 2018 led his first season.

The team was established in 1998 shortly after the integration of women into the South Carolina Corps of Cadets.  Volleyball was the first women's team sport established at The Citadel.

On November 21, 2021, the Bulldogs completed a run through the Southern Conference Volleyball Tournament to claim their first championship, and also their first conference title in any women's team sport.  The Citadel qualified for the 2021 NCAA Division I women's volleyball tournament.

All-time results

Head coaches
The table below shows the Bulldogs head coaches and their records through the 2021–22 season.

See also
List of NCAA Division I women's volleyball programs

References